Joey Coombes (born 21 June 1976), better known as Chester P, is a rapper in the UK hip-hop scene. He was a founding member of Task Force, Bury Crew and the M.U.D. Family. He and his brother Farma G are both sons of the late musician Peet Coombes.

Chester P Hackenbush has a noted style of 'psychedelic' poetry and has a writing style that has fathered many influences since 1993. One of the pioneering UK hip hop artists to have moulded the scene to what it is today.

Chester P's name was taken from The Chester P. Hackenbush Trilogy which are a collection of graphic novels, featured in an early eighties book, with other graphic novels called Brainstorm, written by Bryan Talbot.

Early years 
Coombes was born in Sunderland but grew up in Canonbury, North London and still lives there today with his brother Farma G, his nephew Remus and his mother.

Discography 
New Mic Order (1998) (Mark B presents)
From the Ashes (LP, 2007)
Survive or Die Trying (New Mic Order Part 1) (mixtape, 2008)
New Mic Order Part 2 (mixtape, 2011)
The Postapocalyptic Story Teller (2018)
The Nameless Project (LP, 2019)

Singles and EPs 
"Oh No!"/"Chessmonster" (12", 2007)

References

External links
 Interview at britishhiphop.co.uk, Feb. 2008

1976 births
Living people
English male rappers
People from Canonbury
Rappers from London